This is a list of wars involving the Republic of Nicaragua.

 
Nicaragua
Wars